The United States U-21 men's national soccer team was the national under-21 association football team of the United States. The United States Soccer Federation no longer operates a national team at this age level. 

The U.S. Under-21 Men's National Team served as a transition for players between the Under-20 National Team and senior team as well as to provide extended preparation for the Under-23 National Team.

References 

Soc
U21
U21